Bathurst, an electoral district of the Legislative Assembly in the Australian state of New South Wales, has continuously existed since 1859.


Election results

Elections in the 2010s

2019

2015

2011

Elections in the 2000s

2007

2003

Elections in the 1990s

1999

1995

1991

Elections in the 1980s

1988

1984

1981

Elections in the 1970s

1978

1976

1973

1971

Elections in the 1960s

1968

1967 by-election

1965

1962

Elections in the 1950s

1959

1956

1953

1950

Elections in the 1940s

1947

1944

1941

Elections in the 1930s

1938

1935

1932

1930

Elections in the 1920s

1927
This section is an excerpt from 1927 New South Wales state election § Bathurst

1925
This section is an excerpt from 1925 New South Wales state election § Bathurst

1922
This section is an excerpt from 1922 New South Wales state election § Bathurst

1920
This section is an excerpt from 1920 New South Wales state election § Bathurst

Elections in the 1910s

1917
This section is an excerpt from 1917 New South Wales state election § Bathurst

1913
This section is an excerpt from 1913 New South Wales state election § Bathurst

1910
This section is an excerpt from 1910 New South Wales state election § Bathurst

Elections in the 1900s

1907
This section is an excerpt from 1907 New South Wales state election § Bathurst

1904
This section is an excerpt from 1904 New South Wales state election § Bathurst

1901
This section is an excerpt from 1901 New South Wales state election § Bathurst

1900 by-election

Elections in the 1890s

1898
This section is an excerpt from 1898 New South Wales colonial election § Bathurst

1895
This section is an excerpt from 1895 New South Wales colonial election § Bathurst

1894 by-election

1894

1891
This section is an excerpt from 1891 New South Wales colonial election § Bathurst

Elections in the 1880s

1889
This section is an excerpt from 1889 New South Wales colonial election § Bathurst

1887
This section is an excerpt from 1887 New South Wales colonial election § Bathurst

1886 by-election

1885
This section is an excerpt from 1885 New South Wales colonial election § Bathurst

1884 by-election

1882
This section is an excerpt from 1882 New South Wales colonial election § Bathurst

1880
This section is an excerpt from 1880 New South Wales colonial election § Bathurst

Elections in the 1870s

1877
This section is an excerpt from 1877 New South Wales colonial election § Bathurst

1874-75
This section is an excerpt from 1874-75 New South Wales colonial election § Bathurst

1872
This section is an excerpt from 1872 New South Wales colonial election § Bathurst

Elections in the 1860s

1869-70
This section is an excerpt from 1869-70 New South Wales colonial election § Bathurst

1866 by-election

1864-65
This section is an excerpt from 1864–65 New South Wales colonial election § Bathurst

1860
This section is an excerpt from 1860 New South Wales colonial election § Bathurst

Elections in the 1850s

1859
This section is an excerpt from 1859 New South Wales colonial election § Bathurst

Notes

References

New South Wales state electoral results by district